Max O'Halloran (born 20 May 1952) is a former Australian rules footballer who played with Footscray and Carlton in the Victorian Football League (VFL).

In 2012, O'Halloran announced his intention to run for Division Seven of the Cairns Regional Council, as a part of "Unity 2012", a team of candidates led by Bob Manning.

Notes

External links 

Max O'Halloran's profile at Blueseum
Max O'Halloran's profile on the official Unity 2012 website

1952 births
Carlton Football Club players
Western Bulldogs players
Ulverstone Football Club players
Australian rules footballers from Tasmania
Living people